Special position may refer to:
 Geometric objects not being in general position, such as parallel lines
 The status of the Roman Catholic Church in Ireland, repealed in the Fifth Amendment of the Constitution of Ireland (1972)